Most of the Worst and Some of the Best of Sentridoh is the second album by Sentridoh, the solo home recording project of American rock musician Lou Barlow. It was released by Shrimper Records in 1993.

Track listing

 "American Morning '91"
 "Monkey Racist"
 "Albequerqe '89"
 "Ratherdie"
 "I Can't Wait"
 "Suede"
 "Barbed Wire"
 "Nitemare"
 "What Would It Be Like"
 "Run to You"
 "Meaningless Dead End"
 "Cause For Celebration"
 "Jealous Of Jesus"
 "Mary Christ"
 "Puff In On A Pot Pipe"
 "Alone To Decide"

References

1993 albums
Sentridoh albums
Shrimper Records albums